There are two known receptors for the vasoactive intestinal peptide (VIP) termed VPAC1 and VPAC2. These receptors bind both VIP and pituitary adenylate cyclase-activating polypeptide (PACAP) to some degree. Both receptors are members of the 7 transmembrane G protein-coupled receptor family.

VPAC1 is distributed widely in the CNS, liver, lung, intestine and T-lymphocytes.

VPAC2 is found in the CNS, pancreas, skeletal muscle, heart, kidney, adipose tissue, testis, and stomach.

Vasoactive intestinal peptide (VIP) and pituitary adenylate cyclase-activating peptide (PACAP) receptors are activated by the endogenous peptides VIP, PACAP-38, PACAP-27, peptide histidine isoleucineamide (PHI), peptide histidine methionineamide (PHM) and peptide histidine valine (PHV). “PACAP type II receptors” (VPAC1 and VPAC2 receptors) display comparable affinity for PACAP and VIP, whereas PACAP-27 and PACAP-38 are >100 fold more potent than VIP as agonists of most isoforms of the PAC1 receptor.

References

External links
 
 

G protein-coupled receptors